Pasha Kola or Pasha Kala may refer to:
 Pasha Kola, Chelav, Amol County
 Pasha Kola, Dabuy-ye Jonubi, Amol County
 Pasha Kola, Dasht-e Sar, Amol County
 Pasha Kola, Harazpey-ye Jonubi, Amol County
 Pasha Kola-ye Bish Mahalleh, Harazpey-ye Jonubi Rural District, Amol County
 Pasha Kola, Nowshahr
 Pasha Kola, Qaem Shahr
 Pasha Kola, Bisheh Sar, Qaem Shahr County
 Pasha Kola, Sari
 Pasha Kola-ye Arbabi, Sari County
 Pasha Kola-ye Enteqali, Sari County
 Pasha Kola, Savadkuh
 Pasha Kola, Shirgah, Savadkuh County